Wulfsberg is a surname. Notable people with the surname include:

Gregers Winther Wulfsberg (1780–1846), Norwegian jurist and politician
Niels Wulfsberg (1775–1852), Norwegian priest, newspaper editor, and publisher

See also
Wolfsberg (disambiguation)